Farningham Road railway station is on the Chatham Main Line in England, serving the villages of Farningham, Sutton-at-Hone, Horton Kirby and South Darenth, Kent.

The station and all trains that call are operated by Southeastern.

The ticket office, on the 'up' (London-bound) side, is situated in the substantial station building. This is staffed only during part of the day; at other times a PERTIS passenger-operated ticket machine issues permits to travel, which are exchanged on-train or at staffed stations for travel tickets, and is located on the 'down' (country-bound) platform.

The railway line was electrified as part of the Southern Railway's "Maidstone & Gillingham Electrification" scheme of July 1939. The station was previously named Farningham Road & Sutton-at-Hone.

Services 
All services at Farningham Road are operated by Southeastern using ,  and  EMUs.

The typical off-peak service in trains per hour is:
 1 tph to  via 
 1 tph to 

During the peak hours, the service is increased to 2 tph.

References

External links 

 Kent Rail's page on Farningham Road

Transport in the Borough of Dartford
Railway stations in Kent
Former London, Chatham and Dover Railway stations
Railway stations in Great Britain opened in 1860
Railway stations served by Southeastern